Government Higher Secondary School, Eriyodu is a 6th- to 12th-year state school located in Eriyodu, Dindigul, Tamil Nadu, India.

It was built 60 years ago and currently enrolls approximately 2,000 students of both sexes.

References 

High schools and secondary schools in Tamil Nadu
Education in Dindigul district